Đức Phong is a township and capital of Bù Đăng District, Bình Phước Province, Vietnam.

References

Populated places in Bình Phước province
District capitals in Vietnam
Townships in Vietnam